The Birth of a Race is a 1918 American silent drama film directed by John W. Noble. It was made as a response to the 1915 film The Birth of a Nation, and was meant to discredit the negative stereotypes perpetuated by the film. Initially, it was intended to be a short answer film that could be appended to The Birth of a Nation in 1915 but a combination of weak financial backing and growing ambitions delayed its completion for more than two years.

When finally released in December 1918, following the end of World War I, The Birth of a Race was a two-hour feature-length film, portraying the achievements of black people through history. It premiered in Chicago in December, 1918, to great ballyhoo but was a commercial and critical failure.

This film is preserved at the Library of Congress.

Synopsis
Following the "Birth of the Human Race" section, the film had epic scenes of Ancient Egypt with Nubian soldiers and the rescue of infant Moses in the river. A later scene portrayed Simon of Cyrene helping Jesus carry his cross on the Via Dolorosa and the signing of the Declaration of Independence.

The film then shifted to World War I, with two white brothers in a German-American family going to war on the Western Front, one ("George") fighting for the United States, and the other ("Oscar") fighting for Germany. George is wounded, and at the hospital defends it from a German attack, killing Oscar in the process. George is sent home to America, where he rescues his wife from a German spy.

Cast (in credits order)
Louis Dean	as The Kaiser 
Harry Dumont as The Crown Prince
Carter B. Harkness as Adam
Doris Doscher as Eve
Charles Graham as Noah
Ben Hendricks, Sr.	as Fritz Schmidt (credited as Ben Hendricks)
Alice Gale	as Frau Schmidt
John Reinhardt	as Pat O'Brien
Mary Carr as Mrs. O'Brien (credited as Mary K. Carr)
Jane Grey as Jane O'Brien
Edward Elkas as Herr Von H.
Anna Lehr		
Philip Van Loan		
George LeGuere (credited as George Le Guere)
Warren Chandler		
Anita Cortez		
Edwin Boring		
Dick Lee		
David Wall		
Belle Seacombe

Production

Principal filming took place in Chicago and Tampa, Florida. Several outdoor scenes were filmed in Tampa in January, 1918, including ancient Egypt and the rescue of the infant Moses from a river and Simon of Cyrene helping Jesus carry his cross on the Via Dolorosa.

Reception
Critics complained that the screenplay was muddled about two white brothers fighting on opposite sides in WWI. Birth of a Race also suffered at the box office due to its release just weeks after the end of World War I; audiences were no longer interested in seeing a war film.

See also

List of American films of 1918
Race movie

References

External links 
 
 
The Birth of a Race (full film) on the Internet Archive

Birth Of A Race: The Obscure Demise Of A Would-Be Rebuttal To Racism

1918 films
1918 drama films
Silent American drama films
American silent feature films
American black-and-white films
Films about race and ethnicity
Films shot in Chicago
Films shot in Florida
Films directed by John W. Noble
1910s American films